Tusko is a popular name given to elephants in captivity. Several notable elephants have been given this moniker.

Etymology
The name Tusko is derived from the tusks from the elephant.

Notable elephants

The Meanest Elephant

Formerly known as "Ned", this Tusko was a giant circus elephant captured at age 6 in Siam (now Thailand). He stood just five feet high when he was unloaded from a sailing ship at New York harbor in 1898.

Originally named Ned, he was part of several circuses in the 1900s, including the Great Syndicate Shows, the Great Eastern Shows, and the M.L. Clark & Sons Combined Shows. In 1921, he was purchased by the Al G. Barnes Circus and became its main attraction. He was renamed Tusko. The tusks which presumably earned him his name were about seven feet long (213 centimeters) at this time. By 1922, he was touted as "The Meanest Elephant" as well as "the largest elephant ever in captivity", though at 10-feet-2-inches tall (3.1 meters), he was seven inches shorter than Jumbo.  Nonetheless, Tusko was a ton heavier than Jumbo and the largest elephant in North America since Jumbo. On May 14, 1922, Tusko got loose in Sedro-Woolley, Washington, and caused $20,000 in damage.  

John Ringling bought the circus and sold Tusko to Al Painter, who worked for the Lotus Isle amusement park in Portland, Oregon, where he performed as "Tusko the Magnificent". The March 23, 1931, issue of The Oregonian Newspaper reported that an airplane crash at Lotus Isle spooked the animal, causing Tusko to go on a rampage. Painter sold the elephant to T. H. Eslick, one of Lotus Isle's developers. He spent some time in an exhibition road show, accompanied by his keeper and lifelong devotee, young George "Slim" Lewis. Eslick later abandoned him at the 1931 Oregon State Fair. By this time, his tusks had been reduced to nubbins.

Tusko changed hands repeatedly, until finally Seattle Mayor John F. Dore, taking pity on his poor condition, had him confiscated from his latest owner on October 8, 1932. Tusko ended his days in the Seattle Zoo, dying of a blood clot on June 10, 1933.

The elephant on LSD
"Tusko" was the name of a male Indian elephant at the Oklahoma City Zoo. On August 3, 1962, researchers from the University of Oklahoma injected him with 297 mg of LSD (lysergic acid diethylamide), which is nearly three thousand times the human recreational dose. Within five minutes he collapsed to the ground and one hour and forty minutes later he died. It is believed that the LSD was the cause of his death, although some speculate that the drugs the researchers used in an attempt to revive him may have contributed to his death.

Portland, Oregon Zoo

See also
 List of historical elephants

References

Circus animals
Elephants